The 2021–22 South Dakota State Jackrabbits men's basketball team represented South Dakota State University in the 2021–22 NCAA Division I men's basketball season. The Jackrabbits, led by third-year head coach Eric Henderson, played their home games at Frost Arena in Brookings, South Dakota, as members of the Summit League. They finished the season 30–5, 18–0 in Summit League Play to finish as regular season champions. As the No. 1 seed, they defeated Omaha, South Dakota, and North Dakota State to win the Summit League tournament. They received the conference’s automatic bid to the NCAA tournament as the No. 13 seed in the Midwest Region, where they lost in the first round to Providence.

This was the first season in program history that the Jackrabbits eclipsed 30 wins in a single campaign.

Previous season
In a season limited due to the ongoing COVID-19 pandemic, the Jackrabbits finished the 2020–21 season 16–7, 9–3 in Summit League play to finish as Summit League regular season champions. They defeated Omaha in the quarterfinals of the Summit League tournament, before being upset by the No. 4-seeded and eventual tournament champions, Oral Roberts, in the semifinals.

Roster

Schedule and results

|-
!colspan=12 style=| Non-conference regular season

|-
!colspan=12 style=| Summit League regular season

|-
!colspan=9 style=|Summit League tournament

|-
!colspan=9 style=|NCAA tournament

Source

References

South Dakota State Jackrabbits men's basketball seasons
South Dakota State Jackrabbits
South Dakota State Jackrabbits men's basketball
South Dakota State Jackrabbits men's basketball
South Dakota State